Megachile silverlocki is a species of bee in the family Megachilidae. It was described by English ornithologist Edmund Meade-Waldo in 1913.

References

Silverlocki
Insects described in 1913